Anarestan or Anarstan, also rendered as Anaristan, may refer to:

Anarestan, Dashtestan, Bushehr Province
Anarestan, Jam, Bushehr Province
Anarestan, Fars
Anarestan, Gilan
Anarestan, Kerman
Anarestan, Lorestan
Anarestan, Mazandaran
Anarestan, Yazd
Anarestan, Zanjan
Anarestan Rural District (Fars Province)
Anarestan Rural District (Jam County)